Miss Grand Chile 2019 was the second edition of the Miss Grand Chile beauty pageant, held on May 24, 2019, at the Teatro Parque Cousiño, Santiago. Thirty-two candidates competed for the title, of whom the representative of Los Ángeles, Francisca Lavandero, was announced the winner. She then represented Chile at the Miss Grand International 2019 pageant held on October 25 in Venezuela, and was placed among the top 20 finalists, making her the first Chilean representative to obtain the position at the Miss Grand International pageant.

Results

Contestants
32 contestants competed for the title.

References

External links

 

Miss Grand Chile
Chilean awards
Grand Chile